Hooligans or Rebels? An Oral History of Working-Class Childhood and Youth, 1889–1939 is a 1981 sociology book written by Stephen Humphries and published by Basil Blackwell.

References

External links 

 

1981 non-fiction books
English-language books